Angelique Monique-Paulette Boyer Rousseau (born 4 July 1988), simply known as Angelique Boyer, is an actress. Born in France, she has spent most of her life and her entire professional career in Mexico, becoming a dual French and Mexican citizen.

Early life
Boyer was born in Saint-Claude, Jura, France to French mother and Spanish father. Boyer and her family moved to Mexico when she was two years old.

While filming Rebelde, she and two other co-stars – the actors who portray the characters of Celina (Estefanía Villareal) and José Luján (Zoraida Gómez) - formed the band Citricus or C3Q'S. After Rebelde, Boyer auditioned for Bailando por la Boda de mis Sueños (Dancing for my Dream Wedding).

Transition to mature roles 
In 2009, she was cast in the high crime drama television series Mujeres Asesinas 2. These controversial roles marked a significant change in Boyer's acting career, for this was the first time fans had seen the actress in more mature roles.

Not long after she was the protagonist-antagonist in Teresa, she participated in a theatre role, Ausencia de Dios (God's Absence) she went from "la hembra mala" (femme fatale) to a "monja" (a nun in catholic religion), where she worked with Raquel Olmedo once again, and Jacqueline Andere.

In 2012, Boyer starred in the telenovela Abismo de pasión with David Zepeda.

On June 26, 2013, it was confirmed that Boyer (along with Sebastián Rulli and Luis Roberto Guzmán) would star in Angelli Nesma's Lo que la vida me robó, a remake of Ernesto Alonso's Bodas de odio produced in 1983. In late 2015, she was cast in Angelli Nesma Medina's telenovela Tres veces Ana.

Career

2004-2009 

She first appeared on television in the soap opera produced by Nicandro Díaz and Roberto Hernández Vázquez, Corazones al limite, where she debuted playing the character "Anette", the best friend of the protagonist played by Sara Maldonado, before she moved to another city.

That same year, she participated in the soap opera Rebelde, a version of the Argentine soap opera Rebelde Way, and was produced by Pedro Damián. She was "Vico", a very liberal girl who had some boyfriends during the plot.

In 2007, she returned to television with the novel by Emilio Larrosa, Muchachitas como tú, based on Muchachitas, where she shared credits with Ariadne Díaz. In the plot she was "Margarita", engaged to the villain who also had the role of antagonist, until he was redeemed.

In 2008, she joined the soap opera Alma de Hierro, playing Sandra "Sandy" Hierro Jiménez, a girl who hid from her parents that she had the dream of being dancer, while they wanted the girl to study medicine.

In 2009, she participated in the second season of the television series Mujeres Asesinas, in the episode "Soledad Cautiva", playing Soledad Oropeza "Cindy" a girl who ends up getting involved with a man she met on the road, but what she didn't expect is that he would take her into the life of prostitution.

Later, in the same year, she participated in the novel produced by Salvador Mejía and created by Caridad Bravo Adams, Corazón salvaje. She was "Jimena", a gypsy who hid her condition from the noble "Gabriel", character of Sebastián Zurita.

2010-2016 

In 2010, Boyer got her first starring role in the telenovela Teresa produced by José Alberto Castro. Boyer played protagonist Teresa Chávez Aguirre, alongside Aarón Díaz and Sebastián Rulli.

In 2012, she starred in the telenovela Abismo de Pasión, adapted from the 1996 soap opera Cañaveral de pasiones, and shared credits with David Zepeda.

In 2013, she was chosen by Angelli Nesma Medina to star in the telenovela Lo que la vida me robó, an adaptation of the novels Amor Real and Bodas de odio, starring alongside Sebastián Rulli and Luis Roberto Guzmán. She portrayed Montserrat, a socialite who was dominated by her mother Graziela.

In 2016, Boyer was selected by producer Angelli Nesma Medina to star in Tres veces Ana, an adaptation of Lazos de amor, in which she tarred alongside Sebastián Rulli, David Zepeda and Pedro Moreno. She played three roles as the triplets Ana Lucía, Ana Laura, and Ana Letícia.

2018-present 

In 2018, Boyer appeared in Amar a muerte, starring alongside Michel Brown and Alexis Ayala.

In 2020, producer Giselle González chose Boyer to star in the soap opera Imperio de mentiras, a remake of the Turkish soap opera  Kara Para Aşk. In this series she shared credits with Andrés Palacios, Leticia Calderón, Susana González and Alejandro Camacho. She played Elisa Cantú, a woman trying to solve the mystery of her father's death.

In 2021, she was chosen by the production company Rosy Ocampo to star in Vencer el pasado, playing molecular biologist Renata who is in a love triangle with Sebastián Rulli and Horacio Pancheri.

Musical career

Green Rabanitos 
In 2001, she belonged to the Rabanitos Verdes group, along with five boys. The band sang the opening theme of the children's telenovela María Belén.

C3Q'S 
In 2005, she was part of C3Q'S, a pop group within the soap opera Rebelde with Zoraida Gómez and Estefanía Villarreal, releasing only a single entitled "No Me Importa".

Filmography

Films

Television

Awards and nominations

References

External links

Angelique Boyer's Official Mini Web-Site

1988 births
Living people
21st-century French actresses
21st-century Mexican actresses
French emigrants to Mexico
French television actresses
Mexican female models
Mexican people of French descent
Mexican stage actresses
Mexican telenovela actresses
Mexican television actresses
Naturalized citizens of Mexico
People from Saint-Claude, Jura